Matie Stanley (born 4 May 2003) is a Tuvaluan sprinter.

She was selected to compete in the women's 100 metres at the 2020 Summer Games and was given the honour of being the flag bearer for her nation in the opening ceremony alongside Karalo Maibuca. In the preliminary heats, Stanley placed 8th in her heat with a personal best time of 14.52 seconds, and did not qualify for the next round.

References

External links
 

2003 births
Living people
Athletes (track and field) at the 2020 Summer Olympics
Olympic athletes of Tuvalu
Tuvaluan female sprinters
Olympic female sprinters